Harvir Singh Baidwan (born 31 July 1987) is a cricketer who has played One Day Internationals, Twenty20 International and first-class cricket for Canada.

He was born in Chandigarh.

He made his ODI debut in 2008.

References

External links 

1987 births
Living people
Canada One Day International cricketers
Canada Twenty20 International cricketers
Canadian cricketers
Indian emigrants to Canada
Colts Cricket Club cricketers
Cricketers at the 2011 Cricket World Cup
Cricketers from Chandigarh
Indian cricketers